Tunisia participated in the 2013 IPC Athletics World Championships in Lyon, France. She participated with 12 athletes—6 men and 6 women—and she finished the competition in the 10th rank, with 15 medals: 8 gold, 6 silver, and 1 bronze.

Participants and medallists

 Men
 Walid Ktila    
 Farhat Chida
 Abderrahim Zhiou   
 Abbes Saidi 
 Mohamed Zemzemi 
 Mohamed Charmi
 Women
 Neda Bahi 
 Hania Aidi  
 Raoua Tlili 
 Fathia Amaimia 
 Maroua Ibrahmi 
 Fadhila Nafati

References

2013 IPC Athletics World Championships